ISO 3166-2:TL is the entry for East Timor in ISO 3166-2, part of the ISO 3166 standard published by the International Organization for Standardization (ISO), which defines codes for the names of the principal subdivisions (e.g., provinces or states) of all countries coded in ISO 3166-1.

Currently for East Timor, ISO 3166-2 codes are defined for 12 municipalities and 1 special administrative region.

Each code consists of two parts, separated by a hyphen. The second part is two letters.

Before it became independent from Indonesia in 2002, East Timor was officially assigned the ISO 3166-1 alpha-2 code . Moreover, it was also assigned the ISO 3166-2 code  under the entry for Indonesia.

Current codes
Subdivision names are listed as in the ISO 3166-2 standard published by the ISO 3166 Maintenance Agency (ISO 3166/MA).

ISO 639-1 and ISO 639-2 codes are used to represent subdivision names in the following administrative languages:
 (pt): Portuguese
 (-): Tetum

Click on the button in the header to sort each column.

Changes
The following changes to the entry have been announced by the ISO 3166/MA since the first publication of ISO 3166-2 in 1998.  ISO stopped issuing newsletters in 2013.

See also
 Subdivisions of East Timor

External links
 ISO Online Browsing Platform: TL
 Districts of Timor-Leste, Statoids.com

2:TL
ISO 3166-2
East Timor geography-related lists